Survival Quest is a 1989 survival film written and directed by Don Coscarelli and starring Lance Henriksen, Catherine Keener, and Dermot Mulroney.

Plot 
There are two sets of campers on California's Sierra Madre Mountain. One group is the Blue Legion, a gun-happy squad of teenaged boys under the command of tyrannical survivalist Jake Cannon (Mark Rolston). The other bunch, Survival Quest, is a sort of backpacking self-help group led by humane mountain man Hank Chambers (Lance Henriksen).

The beneficiaries of Hank's wisdom include smart-aleck Joey (Paul Provenza), fragile divorcee Cheryl (Catherine Keener), and alienated convict Gray (Dermot Mulroney). Through various exercises and object lessons beneath the sheltering pines, firm-but-gentle Hank teaches this crew to work together.

Meanwhile, Jake has made harassment of the Survival Questers part of his curriculum. When a viciously ill-mannered Blue Legion member named Raider (Steve Antin) ends up shooting Hank, this breach of discipline annoys Jake to no end.

While Jake was harassing the Survival Questers, Jake actually wanted no one to get shot. Jake starts beating Raider up, and Raider responds by stabbing Jake and blaming it on the Survival Questers.

Now led by Raider, the Blue Legion aims to kill the rival campers. Cheryl is now in charge of the Survival Quest gang, because they think Hank is dead. They hang together and race over the river and through the woods to get to the nearest airstrip.

There, Gray tricks Raider into getting close to a flammable fuel tank, then Gray uses a shotgun to blast the tank, causing an explosion that kills Raider.

As the smoke from this rises on the breeze, an airplane appears. On board is Hank, who managed to overcome his wound and signal for help after he tried to help Jake, who has died.

Cast

External links

1980s adventure films
1989 films
American action thriller films
Films directed by Don Coscarelli
1989 action thriller films
Metro-Goldwyn-Mayer films
American survival films
1980s English-language films
1980s American films
1989 thriller films